Cyprichromis microlepidotus is an African species of fish in the family Cichlidae. It is endemic to Lake Tanganyika, where it is found in the northern part of the lake in Tanzania, Democratic Republic of the Congo, and Burundi.

References

microlepidotus
Fish of Tanzania
Endemic fauna of Tanzania
Taxa named by Max Poll
Taxonomy articles created by Polbot
Fish described in 1956